Cryptolechia sticta is a moth in the family Depressariidae. It was described by Wang in 2006. It is found in Sichuan, China.

The length of the forewings is 16–16.5 mm. The forewings are lutescent (yellowish), with brown scales and with a distinct black dot at the middle of the cell, the end of the cell and at the middle of the fold. The apical area has dense brown scales and there is a blackish spot at the tornus. The hindwings are pale grey.

Etymology
The specific name refers to the black dots of the forewing and is derived from Latin stictus (meaning spotted).

References

Moths described in 2006
Cryptolechia (moth)